The Twin Sisters are a pair of cannons used by Texas Military Forces during the Texas Revolution. They are among the most famous artillery in Texas military history with the "Come and Take It" cannon starting the revolution at the Battle of Gonzales and the Twin Sisters winning it at the Battle of San Jacinto. The Twin Sisters were also potentially used during the Mexican Invasions of 1842 and American Civil War.

Their disappearance and ensuing search efforts have fueled their notoriety, colloquially referred to as the "Texas Holy Grail."

History

Provenance 
Nearly every aspect of the Twin Sisters is debated among historians, archaeologists, and treasure hunters including their design, type (iron or bronze), caliber (four or six pounder), foundry of fabrication (Hawkins and Tatum or Eagle Iron Works/Greenwood), origin of the "Twin Sisters" moniker, where they were used, and where they disappeared.

The earliest and most credible primary source of their name, origin, and role comes from a letter by President of the Republic of Texas, David G. Burnet 92 days after the Battle of San Jacinto. It was written on July 22, 1836 and published in the Telegraph and Texas Register (Columbia, TX Vol. 1, No. 27, Ed. 1) on Tuesday, August 30, 1836:

Name 
The origin of the "Twin Sisters" moniker is debated.

The first documented use of the name comes from a letter by President of the Republic of Texas, David G. Burnet 92 days after the Battle of San Jacinto. It was written on July 22, 1836 and published in the Telegraph and Texas Register (Columbia, TX Vol. 1, No. 27, Ed. 1) on Tuesday, August 30, 1836:

An exposition of the most repeated provenance comes from Elizabeth Mars (née Rice) Stapp in a letter to the editor of The Houston Daily Post on August 24, 1897 — 61 years after the Battle of San Jacinto. It was published in the post (Vol. THIRTEENTH YEAR, No. 147, Ed. 1) on Sunday, August 29, 1897:

Cincinnati connection 
Why Cincinnatians aided Texas is debated. Among the theories include:
Robert Todd Lytle led a fund raising initiative for the cannons because he believed "that as American citizens, we can do no less than encourage the Spirit of Freedom, wherever or by whatever people it might be displayed".
David T. Disney, whose brother Richard Disney was executed in the Goliad Massacre, purportedly worked with Robert Todd Lylte on fund raising.
 Andrew M. Clopper, who served in the Texian Army, is the son of Nicholas Clopper, a land speculator in Cincinnati who owned Morgan's Point, purportedly worked with Robert Todd Lylte on fund raising.
Thomas F. Corry, an emigrant from Cincinnati who served in the Texian Army, may have been related to the "William Corry" of whom President Burnet addressed in his letter of thanks on July 22, 1836.
 Society of the Cincinnati, a fraternity of American Revolutionary War officers dedicated to promoting freedom. Approximately 59 veterans of the American Revolutionary War are buried in Texas and at least 4 are known to have also fought in the Texas Revolution: Benjamin W. Anderson, Alexander Hodge, Antonio Gil Y'Barbo. The fourth, Stephen Williams, also fought in the War of 1812.

On April 7, 1895, Andrew Jackson Houston gifted Santa Anna's dagger, a war trophy from the Battle of San Jacinto, to Cincinnatians.

Texas Revolution 
The Twin Sisters played a vital role as the only Texian artillery in the Battle of San Jacinto, which effectively ended the Texas Revolution and established the Republic of Texas.

They arrived at Brazoria on March 28, 1836 and were received by Captain John M. Allen as the Texian Army, under command of General Sam Houston, was maneuvering against the Mexican Army, under command of General Santa Anna, near San Felipe de Austin, approximately 90 miles away. Fearful of interception, quartermaster general Colonel Almanzon Huston ordered the Twin Sisters to Galveston Island via the schooner Pennsylvania. They arrived on April 3 and were received by Colonel Edward Harcourt. Secretary of War David Thomas then ordered the steamboat Ohio under command of Captain Aaron Burns to retrieve them via the Buffalo Bayou for relocation to Harrisburg. The Ohio arrived at New Washington on April 6 where the schooner Flash, under the command of Captain Luke Falval and supervision of Secretary of the Navy Robert Potter, were waiting with the Twin Sisters.

The Twin Sisters arrived in Harrisburg on April 8 and were loaded onto bullock carts by Major Leander Smith, Captain John M. Allen, and Captain Alfred Henderson Wyly for transport to the Bernardo Plantation (near Hempstead) where the Texian Army was now encamped. The 44,000 acre plantation was the first and largest cotton plantation in Texas. It was established by Old Three Hundred settler Jared E. Groce who freely provided refuge to the Texian cause. Stalled by the "sea of mud" from April showers, the detachment completed the 60 mile trip on April 13. They are received by Lieutenant Colonel James C. Neill, who assigns a company of nine soldiers to each cannon:

On April 20, the Twin Sisters are engaged in combat for the first time during a skirmish near San Jacinto. Artillery commanders from both armies were severely wounded. Mexican commander of the "Golden Standard" Captain Fernando Urriza is relieved by Lieutenant Ygnacio Joaquin del Arenal. Texian commander Lieutenant Colonel James C. Neill is relieved by Inspector General Lieutenant Colonel George Washington Hockley. On April 21 at 4:30p CST, the Twin Sisters, positioned in the center of the formation, initiated the Battle of San Jacinto with the first volley into Mexican forces. With major combat over in 18 minutes, a 1.5:1 strength ratio, and a 28:1 casualty ratio, it is considered by some historians among the most one-sided victories in history. The Twins Sisters final role in the revolution were providing security for the 300 prisoners of war during the Treaties of Velasco.

Sources

Antebellum 
As of 2019, only a few primary sources have been unrecovered mentioning the Twin Sisters following the Texas Revolution. Adding to the extensive confusion of the historical record is the introduction of replicas purchased by various Texas cities, conflation of other artillery by various Texas military units, and the annexation of the Texas Army and Navy into the United States Armed Forces in 1845.

Mexican Invasions of 1842 
The last documented mention of the Twin Sisters occurred during the ongoing military raids and expeditions that followed the Texas Revolution, including a report ordering them to defense in 1842, and a work order in 1843, indicating they may have been used:

 23 June 1842, ordered to San Felipe de Austin by Secretary of War & Marine George W. Hockley "to be in readiness for transportation to any point that may be designated in opening the mediated campaign."
Note: Hockley was the commanding officer of artillery during the Battle of San Jacinto
24 March 1843, ordered by the Ordnance Department to Frederick Schierman for various maintenance.

Houston Twins 

13 December 1841, used for Sam Houston's inauguration as President of the Republic of Texas
1853, used for BBB&C Railway's dedication ceremony
1859, used for Sam Houston's inauguration as Governor of Texas

Presumed final sightings 
 8 February 1864 — dispatch by Confederate Lieutenant Walter W. Blow stating Twin Sisters were in transit to Colonel John S. Ford in San Antonio
Ford took six cannons to Brownsville (presumably including the Twin Sisters) and used them in the Battle of Palmito Ranch
Twin Sisters were left in Fort Brown after Ford learning outcome of Battle of Appomattox Court House
 30 July 1865 — journal entry by Union Corporal M. A. Sweetman saw them in a scrap pile in Houston

Disappearance theories

Notable search efforts

Legacy 

 7 April 1895, Andrew Jackson Houston gifted Santa Anna's dagger, a war trophy from the Battle of San Jacinto, to Cincinnatians
2 March 1897, University of Texas students "borrowed" a Twin from the capitol and fired it for Texas Independence Day, establishing a Texas Exes tradition.
1910, Featured on Sam Houston Grave Monument designed by Pompeo Coppini
1939, Twin Sisters Monument featured at San Jacinto Monument
1985, Twin Sisters exhibit featured in the San Jacinto Museum. Fabricated by students at University of Houston College of Technology.
 1992, Twin Sisters exhibit featured in the Great Hall of Texas Military Forces Museum. Fabricated in 1975 by the "Guard of the Republic" to celebrate the bicentennial of the United States.

See also 
 List of conflicts involving the Texas Military
 Awards and decorations of the Texas Military

References 

Texas Military Department
Texas Military Forces
Lost objects
Archaeology of the United States
Treasure of the United States
Puzzle hunts